This article contains information about the literary events and publications of 1800.

Events
January – Maria Edgeworth's first extended work of fiction, Castle Rackrent ("an Hibernian Tale: Taken from Facts, and from the Manners of the Irish Squires, Before the Year 1782"), is published anonymously in London, variously regarded as the first historical novel, the first regional novel in English, the first Anglo-Irish novel, the first Big House novel, the first saga novel and the first with an unreliable narrator.
January 10 – The Serampore Mission and Press is established in Serampore (now part of West Bengal) India by Baptist missionaries Joshua Marshman and William Ward. The press will grow into the largest in Asia, printing books in nearly every Indian language.
March – English "ploughboy poet" Robert Bloomfield's The Farmer's Boy is published with engravings by Thomas Bewick, selling over 25,000 copies in the next two years, with 15 editions by 1827 and a number of translations.
April 24 – The United States establishes the Library of Congress.
June 14 – Friedrich Schiller's historical drama Mary Stuart has its première in Weimar.
September – William Blake begins three years' residence in a cottage at Felpham in Sussex to illustrate the works of William Hayley; here he begins work on his poem Milton.
October 3 – William and Dorothy Wordsworth, walking near Grasmere in the English Lake District, encounter a leech gatherer who inspires his poem "Resolution and Independence", first written 18 months later.

New books

Fiction
Helen Craik – The Hermit's Cell
Maria Edgeworth – Castle Rackrent
Anne Ford – The School for Fashion
Stéphanie Félicité, Comtesse de Genlis – The Rival Mothers
William Henry Ireland
Gondez the Monk
Rimualdo
Francis Lathom – Mystery
William Linley – Forbidden Apartments
Mary Meeke – Anecdotes of the Altamont Family
Eliza Parsons – The Miser and his Family
Regina Maria Roche
The Nocturnal Visit
The Vicar of Lansdowne
Catherine Selden – Serena
Horatio Smith – A Family Story

Children
François Guillaume Ducray-Duminil
Les Petits orphelins du hameau (The young orphans from the hamlet)
Paul, ou la Ferme abandonnée (Paul or the abandoned farmstead)
Edward Augustus Kendall
The Swallow: a fiction interspersed with poetry
The Stories of Senex; or little histories of little people

Drama
Joanna Baillie – De Monfort
William Godwin – Antonio
 Prince Hoare – Indiscretion
Friedrich Schiller – Maria Stuart

Non-fiction
Jacob Boehme – L'Aurore naissante (translated into French by Louis Claude de Saint-Martin)
Alexander Geddes – Critical Remarks on the Hebrew Scriptures
Elizabeth Hamilton – Memoirs of Modern Philosophers
Arnold Hermann Ludwig Heeren –  (History of the European System of States)
Immanuel Kant – 
Friedrich Wilhelm Joseph Schelling – System of Transcendental Idealism
Parson Weems – A History of the Life and Death, Virtues and Exploits of General George Washington

Births
January 6 – Anna Maria Hall, Irish novelist (died 1881)
January 16 – Robert Bell, Irish-born man of letters (died 1867)
March 25 – Alexis Paulin Paris, French editor of medieval manuscripts (died 1881)
April 17 – Catherine Sinclair, Scottish novelist and children's writer (died 1864)
May 5 – Louis Christophe François Hachette, French publisher (died 1864)
October 18 – Sir Henry Taylor, English dramatist and poet (died 1886)
October 25
Maria Jane Jewsbury, English writer, poet and reviewer (died 1833)
Thomas Babington Macaulay, 1st Baron Macaulay, English-born poet and historian (died 1859)
November 27 – Fanny Kemble, English actress and writer (died 1893)
unknown dates
Costache Aristia, Wallachian translator, poet, dramatist and actor (died 1880)
Thomas Henry Lister, English novelist and Registrar General (died 1842)
Wanda Malecka, Polish translator, poet and novelist (died 1860)

Deaths
January 22 – George Steevens, English Shakespearean commentator (born 1736)
February 22 – Joseph Warton, English academic and literary critic (born 1722)
March 14 – Daines Barrington, English lawyer, antiquary and naturalist (born c. 1727)
March 29 – Marc René, marquis de Montalembert, French military engineer and writer (born 1714)
April 25 – William Cowper, English poet (born 1731)
August 25 – Elizabeth Montagu, English literary critic (born 1718)
September 29 – Michael Denis, Austrian poet (born 1729)
December 26 – Mary Robinson, English poet (born 1757)

References

 
Years of the 18th century in literature